The Lincolnshire Football Association, often known simply as the Lincolnshire FA, is the governing body of football in the county of Lincolnshire, England. The Lincolnshire FA runs a number of cups at different levels for teams all across Lincolnshire.

Affiliated Leagues

Men's Saturday Leagues
Lincolnshire Football League 
Boston and District League
East Lincolnshire Combination
Grantham and District Saturday League
Lincoln League
Scunthorpe and District League

Men's Sunday Leagues
Boston and District Sunday League 
Grantham and District Sunday League
Grimsby Cleethorpes and District Sunday League
Grimsby Intermediate League (Sunday)
Lincoln and District Sunday League  
Scunthorpe and District Sunday League  
Spalding and District Sunday League

Ladies and Girls Leagues
Lincolnshire Women's County League 
Lincolnshire County Girls League 
South Humber Ladies League

Other Leagues
Lincolnshire Ability Counts League

Youth Leagues
Lincolnshire Intermediate League (U18)
Caparo Junior League
Caparo Mini Soccer League
Gainsborough and District Mini Soccer League
Grantham Youth League
Mid Lincs Mini Soccer League  
Mid Lincs Youth League (Boys)

Small Sided Leagues
Champion Soccer Lincoln Soccer Six 
Grimsby Football Mundial Monday League 
Grimsby Football Mundial Thursday League
North Kesteven Soccer Sixes 
Scunthorpe Mundial Six A Side League
Scunthorpe Sunday Soccer Sixes League
Yarborough Soccer Sixes

References

External links

County football associations
Football in Lincolnshire